

1969–70

The year 1969 was a turning point in Washington sports history. The University of Maryland had hired Lefty Driesell to coach basketball. The Senators named Ted Williams as manager. The Washington Redskins hired Vince Lombardi as Head Coach and he had brought a winning attitude to the nation's capital. It marked a renaissance in sports interest in America's most transient of cities.

Personnel

NBA draft

1970–71

NBA draft

1971–72

Lefty Driesell started the tradition of Midnight Madnessin 1971 with an unofficial session that was attended by 3,000 fans at the University of Maryland's football stadium, Byrd Stadium.

National Invitation tournament
First Round
Maryland 67, St. Josephs 55
Second Round
Maryland 71, Syracuse 65
Semifinal
Maryland 91, Jacksonville 77 
Final
Maryland 100, Niagara 69

Awards and honors
 Tom McMillen, NIT Most Valuable Player
 Tom McMillen, First Team All ACC
 Tom McMillen, Third Team All-American

In April 1972, assistant George Raveling became the head coach at Washington State in the Pac-8 Conference.

1972–73

In the offseason, Tom McMillen was a member of the US national team that took part in Basketball at the 1972 Summer Olympics.

NCAA tournament
East
Maryland 91, Syracuse 75
Providence 103, Maryland 89

Awards and honors
 Tom McMillen, Second Team All-American
 Tom McMillen, First Team All ACC

NBA draft

1973–74

Maryland participated in the ACC Final. The Final pitted two of the top teams in the country. It has been regarded by many to be the greatest ACC game in history — and one of the greatest college games ever.  The game was instrumental in forcing the expansion of the NCAA Men's Division I Basketball Championship to 32 teams, allowing more than one bid from a conference. 
Maryland had six future NBA draft picks on the team. The six picks were Tom McMillen and Len Elmore (1974), Tom Roy and Owen Brown (1975) and John Lucas and Mo Howard (1976). It is considered the greatest team that did not participate in the NCAA tournament.

ACC tournament
The 1974 Atlantic Coast Conference men's basketball tournament was held in Greensboro, North Carolina at the Greensboro Coliseum from March 7–9. North Carolina State defeated Maryland in overtime 103–100 to claim the championship. 
Quarterfinals (March 7): Maryland 85, Duke 66
Semifinals (March 8): Maryland 105, North Carolina 85
Finals (March 9): NC State 103, Maryland 100

Awards and honors
 Lefty Driesell, NCAA Award of Valor
 Len Elmore, First Team All ACC 
 Len Elmore, Second Team All-American
 John Lucas, First Team All ACC
 John Lucas, Second Team All-American
 Tom McMillen, Second Team All-American

NBA draft

1974–75

In the offseason, John Lucas played for the US national team in the 1974 FIBA World Championship, winning the bronze medal.

NCAA tournament
Midwest
Maryland 83, Creighton 79
Maryland 83, Notre Dame 71
Louisville 96, Maryland 82

Awards and honors
 John Lucas, First Team All-American
 John Lucas, First Team All ACC
 FIBA Intercontinental Cup Champions, 1974 FIBA Intercontinental Cup

NBA draft

1975–76

Awards and honors
 John Lucas, First Team All-American
 John Lucas, First Team All ACC

NBA draft

1976–77

NBA draft

1977–78

NBA draft

1978–79

NBA draft

References

External links 
http://www.umterps.com/
https://web.archive.org/web/20090206225040/http://umterps.cstv.com/sports/m-baskbl/archive/md-m-baskbl-2001.html

1970